The Harney Basin duskysnail, scientific name Colligyrus depressus, is a species of freshwater snail, an aquatic gastropod mollusk in the family Hydrobiidae.

This species is endemic to the United States, specifically to the Harney Basin area of Oregon.

References

Hydrobiidae
Gastropods described in 1999
Taxonomy articles created by Polbot